The Kings of Dál nAraidi were rulers of one of the main kingdoms of Ulster and competed with the Dál Fiatach for the overlordship of Ulaid.

The dynasty resided at Ráith Mór, east of Antrim in the Mag Line area and emerged as the dominant group among the Cruthin of Ulaid. In the sixth and seventh centuries the Cruthin were a loose confederation of petty states with the Dal nAraidi emerging as the dominant group in the 8th century.

Kings of Dál nAraidi and Cruthin
List of the Kings of Dál nAraidi;

 Cáelbad mac Cruind Ba Druí
 Sárán mac Cóelbad
 Condlae mac Cóelbad
 Fíachna Lonn mac Cóelbad (flourished 482)
 Eochaid mac Condlai (d. 553)
 Aed Brecc (d. 563)
 Báetán mac Echach
 Áed Dub mac Suibni (d. 588)
 Fiachnae mac Báetáin (Fiachnae Lurgan)  (d. 626)
 Congal Cáech (Cláen) mac Scandail  (d. 637)
 Lochéne mac Finguine (d. 646)
 Scandal mac Bécce (d. 646)
 Eochaid Iarlaithe mac Lurgain (d. 666) 
 Máel Cáich mac Scannail (d. 666)
 Cathassach mac Lurgain (d. 668)
 Dúngal Eilni mac Scandail  (d. 681)
 Cathassach mac Máele Cáich  (d. 682)
 Ailill mac Dúngaile Eilni (d. 690)
 Áed Aired (d. 698)
 Cú Chuarán mac Dúngail Eilni  (d. 708)
 Lethlobar mac Echach (d. 709)
 Fiachra Cossalach (d. 710)
 Dubthach mac Congail
 Eochaid mac Echach (d.715)
 Indrechtach mac Lethlobair(d.741)
 Cathussach mac Ailello (d.749)
 Flathróe mac Fiachrach (d.774)
 Cináed Ciarrge mac Cathussaig (d.776)
 Tommaltach mac Indrechtaig (d.790)
 Bressal mac Flathroe (d.792)
 Eochaid mac Bressail (d.824)
 Cináed mac Eochada (d.832)
 Flannacán mac Eochada (died 849)
 Lethlobar mac Loingsig (d.873)
 Cenn Etig mac Lethlobuir (d.900)

The later rulers of the Dál nAraidi adopted the dynastic surname Ua Loingsig (Ó Loingsigh), anglicized Lynch.

See also
Kings of Ulster

Notes

References

 Annals of Tigernach
 Annals of the Four Masters
 Annals of Ulster
 Francis J.Byrne, Irish Kings and High-Kings 
 Book of Leinster
 Laud Synchronisms
 The Laud Genealogies and Tribal Histories, ed. Kuno Meyer 
 The Chronology of the Irish Annals, Daniel P. McCarthy
 Genealogies from Rawlinson B 502, compiled by Donnchadh Ó Corráin

 
Dal nAraidi